Thaxterina is a genus in the Tubeufiaceae family of fungi. This is a monotypic genus, containing the single species Thaxterina multispora.

References

External links
Thaxterina at Index Fungorum

Tubeufiaceae
Monotypic Dothideomycetes genera